Surian station is a mass rapid transit (MRT) station serving the suburb of Kota Damansara in Petaling Jaya, Selangor, Malaysia. It is one of the stations on the MRT Sungai Buloh-Kajang Line. The station is named after Persiaran Surian, the road above which the station is situated. The station was opened on 16 December 2016 under phase one operations of the MRT Sungai Buloh-Kajang Line.

The station is located near the Dataran Sunway commercial area in Kota Damansara where the Sunway Giza Shopping Centre, Sunway Nexis and many shops are located.

Station Features

The station adopts the standard elevated station design for the MRT Sungai Buloh-Kajang Line, with two side platforms above the concourse level. The station is located directly above Persiaran Surian, with its supporting columns sited along the median of the road.

The station is located next to the Dataran Sunway commercial area or Section PJU5 of Kota Damansara. The Sunway Giza Mall is also located near the station while Encorp Strand Mall and Giant Hypermarket Kota Damansara are located about 1 km away.

Station layout

Exits and entrances
The station has two entrances - Entrance A and Entrance B - situated on both sides of Persiaran Surian. Entrance B is also accessible from Jalan PJU 5/8 which runs parallel to Persiaran Surian.

A pedestrian link bridge connects Entrance B with the Sunway Nexis development. Another elevated pedestrian linkway has also been constructed to connect the station's Entrance A with the Tropicana Gardens, a 17-acre mixed development by Tropicana Corporation Berhad, on the south side of Persiaran Surian but remains unopened until construction of the development is completed.

There are feeder bus stops, taxi lay-bys and also drop-off areas at both entrances along Persiaran Surian.

History
Before the station name was finalised, the station was assigned the working name Dataran Sunway MRT Station, after the Dataran Sunway commercial area.

Bus Services

Feeder buses
With the opening of the MRT Sungai Buloh-Kajang Line, feeder buses also began operating linking the station with several housing and industrial areas in Sunway Damansara, Tropicana and Subang. The feeder buses operate from the station's feeder bus stops adjacent to the station.

Other buses

Gallery

Station

Sunway Nexis-Surian MRT station link bridge

Concourse

See also
MRT Sungai Buloh-Kajang Line
Kota Damansara

References

External links
 Surian MRT station - MRT Website
 Klang Valley Mass Rapid Transit website

Rapid transit stations in Selangor
Sungai Buloh-Kajang Line
Railway stations opened in 2016